Ruffino's Bakery is a bakery in New Orleans, Louisiana, founded in 1907 by Giuseppe Rufino (born Cinisi, Italy).

In 1907, Ruffino decided to become his own boss and began the Ruffino Bakery, supplying Italian bread to the metropolitan community. The bakery was originally at 630 St. Philip St., and moved several times, eventually having its permanent home at 625-627 St. Philip St.

In the early 1930s, Ruffino retired and sold the bakery to Nicolo Evola, his son-in-law, who was married to Giuseppe's daughter Fanny. Its name was changed to the United Bakery. It was temporally moved to 2206 Royal St., and then in 1943 to St. Bernard Ave., which was its permanent home until Hurricane Katrina destroyed the building in 2005. A lack of flood insurance forced the business to close. However, Ruffino's great-grandson, Mark Philippi of Laurel Wholesale Bakery, has revised the recipe and marketed it once more.

References

Bakeries of the United States
Food and drink companies based in Louisiana